Saboudougou is a town in the far west of Ivory Coast. It is a sub-prefecture of Ouaninou Department in Bafing Region, Woroba District.

Saboudougou was a commune until March 2012, when it became one of 1126 communes nationwide that were abolished.
In 2014, the population of the sub-prefecture of Saboudougou was 3,918.

Villages
The six villages of the sub-prefecture of Saboudougou and their population in 2014 are:
 Gomandougou (112)
 Kpoho 1 (675)
 Ouéna (362)
 Saboudougou (1 939)
 Sogbessèdougou (334)
 Zodoufouma (496)

Notes

Sub-prefectures of Bafing Region
Former communes of Ivory Coast